Laura García-Caro Lorenzo (born 16 April 1995) is a female racewalker from Spain. She competed in the Women's 20 kilometres walk event at the 2015 World Championships in Athletics in Beijing, China, finishing the 32nd.

Competition record

See also
 Spain at the 2015 World Championships in Athletics

References

External links
 
 
 
 

1995 births
Living people
Spanish female racewalkers
Place of birth missing (living people)
World Athletics Championships athletes for Spain
Athletes (track and field) at the 2020 Summer Olympics
Olympic athletes of Spain
20th-century Spanish women
21st-century Spanish women